The People I've Slept With is a 2009 American sex comedy film directed by Quentin Lee.

Plot
Angela Yang (Karin Anna Cheung) is a young woman who enjoys sex and has had a number of partners. As mementos, she photographs her lovers and gives each of them a nickname.

When she finds out she's pregnant, she decides to keep the baby. She then sets out to locate the five men who might be the father and decide if she can have a more permanent relationship with any of them.

Cast
 Karin Anna Cheung as Angela
 Wilson Cruz as Gabriel
 Archie Kao as Jefferson
 Lynn Chen as Juliet
 James Shigeta as Charles Yang
 Rane Jameson as Lawrence
 Randall Park as Carlton Kim
 Stacie Leah Rippy as Becky
 Danny Vasquez as Ron Guzman
 Chris Zylka as Alex Flynn
 Rylan Williams as Preston
 Dana Lee as Mr. Lee
 Elizabeth Sung as Mrs. Lee
 Cathy Shim as Nikki
 Perry Smith as Mrs. Robinson

Reception

Critical response
Review aggregator Rotten Tomatoes gives the film a rating of 27% based on 11 reviews, with an average rating of 5.5/10. Film critic Frank Scheck of the Associated Press wrote in his review for The Hollywood Reporter: "Largely devoid of the sex-farce style comic wit to which it aspires, the film is palatable largely because of the charm of lead actress Cheung, who manages to make her character appealing even while she's behaving in a manner that would embarrass the horny male teens in the American Pie movies."

Release
The People I've Slept With was released in October 2009 at the São Paulo International Film Festival. The film was released on DVD on March 22, 2011, by Maya Films.

References

External links
 
 

2009 films
Films about Chinese Americans
2009 LGBT-related films
American sex comedy films
2000s sex comedy films
2009 comedy films
2000s English-language films
2000s American films